Priekuļi Municipality is a former municipality in Vidzeme, Latvia. The municipality was formed in 2009 by merging Liepa Parish, Mārsnēni Parish, Priekuļi Parish and Veselava Parish, the administrative centre being Priekuļi. As of 2020, the population was 7,556.

On 1 July 2021, Priekuļi Municipality ceased to exist and its territory was merged into Cēsis Municipality.

See also 
 Administrative divisions of Latvia (2009)

References 

 
Former municipalities of Latvia